1999 Khulna mosque bombing was a terrorist bomb attack on an Ahmadiyya Mosque in Khulna, Bangladesh on 8 October 1999. In the explosion 8 people died and around 30 were injured. On 10 October 1999 Bangladesh Army removed a time bomb from the headquarters complex of Ahmadiyya mission in Dhaka, three days after the bombing. Two days after a bomb was recovered from Jannatul Ferdous Ahmadiya mosque in Mirpur, Dhaka.

Background 
The Ahmadiyya are small sect of Islam whom many conservative Muslims consider heretical. There are about 100, 000 Ahmadiyyas in Bangladesh, where 90 percent of the population follow Islam.

Attack
On 8 October 1999 a remote controlled bomb went off during Friday prayers in the Ahmadiyya mosque in Khulana, Southern Bangladesh, killing eight people.

References

1999 in Islam
Improvised explosive device bombings in 1999
History of Bangladesh (1971–present)
Terrorist incidents in Bangladesh in 1999
Islamic terrorist incidents in 1999
October 1999 events in Asia
October 1999 crimes
Persecution of Ahmadis
Khulna
Terrorism in Bangladesh
Mosque bombings in Asia
Mosque bombings in Bangladesh